The CCC Company 947 Powder Magazine is a historic powder magazine in the eastern part of Ouachita National Forest. It is located in southern Yell County, about  down a slope north of a ridge running parallel to Forest Road 71. The entrance is on the southeast side. The building was erected about 1933 by a crew of the Civilian Conservation Corps, and was used to store explosive materials used in the construction of roads and bridges in the area.

The building was listed on the National Register of Historic Places in 2007.

See also
National Register of Historic Places listings in Yell County, Arkansas

References

National Register of Historic Places in Yell County, Arkansas
Buildings and structures completed in 1933
Ouachita National Forest
Civilian Conservation Corps in Arkansas
1933 establishments in Arkansas
Gunpowder magazines